Brough is a settlement in western Whalsay in the parish of Nesting in the Shetland islands of Scotland.  It lies to the southwest of Challister, northeast of New Park, and north of Tripwell. To the north is Kirk Ness, and Whalsay Parish Church.

History
Historically, fishing has been the main source of income in Brough. There is a burnt mound in the south of the village and an old horizontal mill which first appeared on an 1882 map.

Cup marks
The upper group features 10 much-weathered cups, around 2 inches in diameter on average and as deep as an inch in an area of about 18 by 19 inches. The lower group features at least 19 weathered cups, measuring from between 2.5 and 3.5 inches in diameter and 1 to 2 inches deep, in an area of around 18 by 10 inches. There is an isolated cup, about 70 yards to the south.

References

External links

Canmore - Whalsay, Suther Ness site record
Canmore - Whalsay, Kirk Ness, Whalsay Kirk site record

Villages in Whalsay